Rui Filipe Alves Oliveira (born 5 September 1996) is a Portuguese cyclist, who currently rides for UCI WorldTeam . He competed in the scratch event at the 2015 UCI Track Cycling World Championships. His twin brother, Ivo Oliveira, is also an international track cyclist.

In October 2020, he was named in the startlist for the 2020 Vuelta a España.

Major results

Road

2017
 8th Overall Joe Martin Stage Race
1st  Young rider classification
2018
 1st  Road race, National Under-23 Road Championships
 6th Arno Wallaard Memorial
 7th Handzame Classic
 7th ZLM Tour
 9th Primus Classic
2021
 2nd Road race, National Road Championships
2022
 4th Road race, National Road Championships
2023
 8th Trofeo Ses Salines–Alcúdia
 9th Omloop Het Nieuwsblad

Grand Tour general classification results timeline

Track

2013
 1st  Scratch race, National Junior Championships
2014
 National Junior Championships
1st  Sprint
1st  Team sprint
1st  Team pursuit
 UCI World Junior Championships
3rd  Scratch race
3rd  Madison (with Ivo Oliveira)
 3rd  Scratch race, UEC European Junior Championships
2016
 1st  Keirin, National Championships
2017
 1st  Elimination race, UEC European Under-23 Championships
 3rd  Elimination race, UEC European Championships
 3rd Madison (with Ivo Oliveira), UCI World Cup, Minsk
2018
 1st  Madison (with Ivo Oliveira), National Championships
 2nd  Elimination race, UEC European Championships
2019
 National Championships
1st  Madison (with João Matias)
1st  Omnium
 3rd Omnium, UCI World Cup, Minsk
2020
 2nd  Madison (with Ivo Oliveira), UEC European Championships
2021
 UEC European Championships
1st  Scratch race
3rd  Madison (with Iúri Leitão)
2023
 2nd  Elimination race, UEC European Championships

References

External links
 

1996 births
Living people
Portuguese track cyclists
Portuguese male cyclists
Sportspeople from Vila Nova de Gaia
Cyclists at the 2019 European Games
European Games competitors for Portugal